Tetragnatha torrensis is a species of long-jawed orb weaving spiders of the family Tetragnathidae. It is endemic on the island of Santo Antão, Cape Verde. The species name torrensis refers to the place where it was found: Ribeira da Torre.

References

Tetragnathidae
Spiders of Africa
Spiders described in 1994
Taxa named by Günter E. W. Schmidt
Taxa named by Friedhelm Piepho
Arthropods of Cape Verde
Endemic fauna of Cape Verde
Fauna of Santo Antão, Cape Verde
Ribeira Grande Municipality